Christina Riesselman is an American paleoceanographer whose research focus is on Southern Ocean response to changing climate.

Early life and education
After completing her bachelor's degree at the University of Nebraska-Lincoln in Geology and English in 2001, Riesselman spent time at the Joint Oceanographic Institution in Washington DC, then moved to Stanford for her PhD which was completed in 2011.

Career 
Following postdoctoral work as a Research Scientist with the US Geological Survey, she moved to the University of Otago, New Zealand in 2013.

Riesselman uses diatom micropaleontology and stable isotope geochemistry in marine sediments to examine the evolution of the Antarctic cryosphere through the Cenozoic. She also participates in collaborative investigations into the modern controls on phytoplankton community structure.

Riesselman with her husband, Chris Moy, a University of Otago paleoclimatologist, are among the 30 researchers on the JOIDES Resolution. The aim of the voyage, according to Reisselman, is to figure out how ocean circulation behaved during past warmer climates, up to three million years ago.

Awards and honors
Riesselman won the inaugural L’Oréal-UNESCO Fellowship for Women in Science New Zealand in 2015.

Publications 

Source:

Working Paper; Discussion Paper; Technical Report 

 Expedition 318 Scientists, including Riesselman, C. (2010). Wilkes Land glacial history: Cenozoic east Antarctic ice sheet evolution from Wilkes Land margin sediments [Integrated Ocean Drilling Program Expedition 318 Preliminary Report]. Integrated Ocean Drilling Program Management International. 101p. doi: 10.2204/iodp.pr.318.2010

Journal - Research Article 

 Ohneiser, C., Yoo, K.-C., Albot, O. B., Cortese, G., Riesselman, C., Lee, J. I., … Bollen, M., … Beltran, C., … Wilson, G. S. (2019). Magneto-biostratigraphic age models for Pleistocene sedimentary records from the Ross Sea. Global & Planetary Change. Advance online publication. doi: 10.1016/j.gloplacha.2019.02.013
 Wilson, D. J., Bertram, R. A., Needham, E. F., van der Flierdt, T., Welsh, K. J., McKay, R. M., … Riesselman, C. R., … Escutia, C. (2018). Ice loss from the East Antarctic Ice Sheet during late Pleistocene interglacials. Nature, 561, 383-386. doi: 10.1038/s41586-018-0501-8
 Taylor-Silva, B. I., & Riesselman, C. R. (2018). Polar frontal migration in the warm late Pliocene: Diatom evidence from the Wilkes Land margin, East Antarctica. Paleoceanography & Paleoclimatology, 33(1), 76-92. doi: 10.1002/2017PA003225
 Pettinger, V., Martin, C. E., & Riesselman, C. R. (2018). Sources and downstream variation of surface water chemistry in the dammed Waitaki catchment, South Island, New Zealand. New Zealand Journal of Geology & Geophysics, 61(2), 207-218. doi: 10.1080/00288306.2018.1465985
 Bertram, R. A., Wilson, D. J., van de Flierdt, T., McKay, R. M., Patterson, M. O., Jimenez-Espejo, F. J., … Duke, G. C., Taylor-Silva, B. I., & Riesselman, C. R. (2018). Pliocene deglacial event timelines and the biogeochemical response offshore Wilkes Subglacial Basin, East Antarctica. Earth & Planetary Science Letters, 494, 109-116. doi: 10.1016/j.epsl.2018.04.054
 Anderson, H. J., Moy, C. M., Vandergoes, M. J., Nichols, J. E., Riesselman, C. R., & Van Hale, R. (2018). Southern Hemisphere westerly wind influence on southern New Zealand hydrology during the Lateglacial and Holocene. Journal of Quaternary Science, 33(6), 689-701. doi: 10.1002/jqs.3045
 Browne, I. M., Moy, C. M., Riesselman, C. R., Neil, H. L., Curtin, L. G., Gorman, A. R., & Wilson, G. S. (2017). Late Holocene intensification of the westerly winds at the subantarctic Auckland Islands (51° S), New Zealand. Climate of the Past, 13(10), 1301-1322. doi: 10.5194/cp-13-1301-2017
 Levy, R., Harwood, D., Florindo, F., Sangiorgi, F., Tripati, R., von Eynatten, H., … and SMS Science Team, including Ohneiser, C., Riesselman, C., & Wilson, G. (2016). Antarctic ice sheet sensitivity to atmospheric CO2 variations in the early to mid-Miocene. PNAS, 113(13), 3453-3458. doi: 10.1073/pnas.1516030113
 Dlabola, E. K., Wilson, G. S., Gorman, A. R., Riesselman, C. R., & Moy, C. M. (2015). A post-glacial relative sea-level curve from Fiordland, New Zealand. Global & Planetary Change, 131, 104-114. doi: 10.1016/j.gloplacha.2015.05.010
 Patterson, M. O., McKay, R., Naish, T., Escutia, C., Jimenez-Espejo, F. J., Raymo, M. E., … and IODP Expedition 318 Scientists, including Riesselman, C. R. (2014). Orbital forcing of the East Antarctic ice sheet during the Pliocene and Early Pleistocene. Nature Geoscience, 7(11), 841-847. doi: 10.1038/ngeo2273
 Dowsett, H. J., Foley, K. M., Stoll, D. K., Chandler, M. A., Sohl, L. E., Bentsen, M., … Riesselman, C., … Zhang, Z. (2013). Sea surface temperature of the mid-piacenzian ocean: A data-model comparison. Scientific Reports, 3. doi: 10.1038/srep02013
 Cook, C. P., van de Flierdt, T., Williams, T., Hemming, S. R., Iwai, M., Kobayashi, M., … Riesselman, C., … and IODP Expedition 318 Scientists. (2013). Dynamic behaviour of the East Antarctic ice sheet during Pliocene warmth. Nature Geoscience, 6(9), 765-769. doi: 10.1038/ngeo1889
 Houben, A. J. P., Bijl, P. K., Pross, J., Bohaty, S. M., Passchier, S., Stickley, C. E., … Expedition 318 Scientists, including Riesselman, C. (2013). Reorganization of Southern Ocean plankton ecosystem at the onset of Antarctic glaciation. Science, 340(6130), 341-344. doi: 10.1126/science.1223646
 Stocchi, P., Escutia, C., Houben, A. J. P., Vermeersen, B. L. A., Bijl, P. K., Brinkhuis, H., … and IODP Expedition 318 Scientists, including Riesselman, C. (2013). Relative sea-level rise around East Antarctica during Oligocene glaciation. Nature Geoscience, 6(5), 380-384. doi: 10.1038/NGEO1783
 Riesselman, C. R., & Dunbar, R. B. (2013). Diatom evidence for the onset of Pliocene cooling from AND-1B, McMurdo Sound, Antarctica. Palaeogeography, Palaeoclimatology, Palaeoecology, 369, 136-153. doi: 10.1016/j.palaeo.2012.10.014
 Bijl, P. K., Bendle, J. A. P., Bohaty, S. M., Pross, J., Schouten, S., Tauxe, L., … Expedition 318 Scientists, including Riesselman, C. (2013). Eocene cooling linked to early flow across the Tasmanian Gateway. PNAS, 110(24), 9645-9650. doi: 10.1073/pnas.1220872110
 Dowsett, H. J., Robinson, M. M., Haywood, A. M., Hill, D. J., Dolan, A. M., Stoll, D. K., … Riesselman, C. R. (2012). Assessing confidence in Pliocene sea surface temperatures to evaluate predictive models. Nature Climate Change, 2(5), 365-371. doi: 10.1038/nclimate1455
 Wilson, G. S., Levy, R. H., Naish, T. R., Powell, R. D., Florindo, F., Ohneiser, C., … Riesselman, C., … Wise, S. (2012). Neogene tectonic and climatic evolution of the Western Ross Sea, Antarctica: Chronology of events from the AND-1B drill hole. Global & Planetary Change, 96-97, 189-203. doi: 10.1016/j.gloplacha.2012.05.019
 Sjunneskog, C., Riesselman, C., Winter, D., & Scherer, R. (2012). Fragilariopsis diatom evolution in Pliocene and Pleistocene Antarctic shelf sediments. Micropaleontology, 58(3), 273-289.
 Winter, D., Sjunneskog, C., Scherer, R., Maffioli, P., Riesselman, C., & Harwood, D. (2012). Pliocene-Pleistocene diatom biostratigraphy of nearshore Antarctica from the AND-1B drillcore, McMurdo Sound. Global & Planetary Change, 96-97, 59-74. doi: 10.1016/j.gloplacha.2010.04.004
 McKay, R., Naish, T., Carter, L., Riesselman, C., Dunbar, R., Sjunneskog, C., … Powell, R. D. (2012). Antarctic and Southern Ocean influences on Late Pliocene global cooling. PNAS, 109(17), 6423-6428. doi: 10.1073/pnas.1112248109
 Tauxe, L., Stickley, C. E., Sugisaki, S., Bijl, P. K., Bohaty, S. M., Brinkhuis, H., … Riesselman, C. R., … Yamane, M. (2012). Chronostratigraphic framework for the IODP Expedition 318 cores from the Wilkes Land Margin: Constraints for paleoceanographic reconstruction. Paleoceanography, 27(2), PA2214. doi: 10.1029/2012PA002308
 Pross, J., Contreras, L., Bijl, P. K., Greenwood, D. R., Bohaty, S. M., Schouten, S., … and Integrated Ocean Drilling Program Expedition 318 Scientists, including Riesselman, C. R. (2012). Persistent near-tropical warmth on the Antarctic continent during the early Eocene epoch. Nature, 487(7409), 73-77. doi: 10.1038/nature11300
 Riesselman, C. R. (2012). Fragilariopsis tigris sp. nov.: A new late Pliocene Antarctic continental shelf diatom with biostratigraphic promise. Micropaleontology, 58(4), 367-376.
 Escutia, C., Brinkhuis, H., Klaus, A., and the IODP Expedition 318 Scientists, including Riesselman, C. (2011). IODP Expedition 318: From greenhouse to icehouse at the Wilkes Land Antarctic margin. Scientific Drilling, (12), 15-23. doi: 10.2204/iodp.sd.12.02.2011
 Passchier, S., Browne, G., Field, B., Fielding, C. R., Krissek, L. A., Panter, K., … and ANDRILL-SMS Science Team, including Ohneiser, C., Palin, M., Riesselman, C., & Wilson, G. (2011). Early and middle Miocene Antarctic glacial history from the sedimentary facies distribution in the AND-2A drill hole, Ross Sea, Antarctica. Geological Society of America Bulletin, 123(11-12), 2352-2365. doi: 10.1130/B30334.1
 Peck, V. L., Yu, J., Kender, S., & Riesselman, C. R. (2010). Shifting ocean carbonate chemistry during the Eocene-Oligocene climate transition: Implications for deep-ocean Mg/Ca paleothermometry. Paleoceanography, 25(4), PA4219. doi: 10.1029/2009PA001906
 Frank, T. D., Gui, Z., and the ANDRILL SMS Science Team, including Ohneiser, C., Palin, M., Riesselman, C., & Wilson, G. (2010). Cryogenic origin for brine in the subsurface of southern McMurdo Sound, Antarctica. Geology, 38(7), 587-590. doi: 10.1130/G30849.1
 Naish, T., Powell, R., Levy, R., Wilson, G., Scherer, R., Talarico, F., … Ohneiser, C., … Riesselman, C., … Williams, T. (2009). Obliquity-paced pliocene west antarctic ice sheet oscillations. Nature, 458(7236), 322-328. doi: 10.1038/nature07867
 Acton, G., Crampton, J., Di Vincenzo, G., Fielding, C. R., Florindo, F., Hannah, M., … Ohneiser, C., … Riesselman, C., … Wilson, G. S., … and the ANDRILL-SMS Science Team. (2008-2009). Preliminary integrated chronostratigraphy of the AND-2A core, ANDRILL Southern McMurdo Sound Project, Antarctica. Terra Antartica, 15(1-2), 211-220.
 Tortell, P. D., Payne, C. D., Li, Y., Trimborn, S., Rost, B., Smith, W. O., Riesselman, C., … DiTullio, G. R. (2008). CO2 sensitivity of Southern Ocean phytoplankton. Geophysical Research Letters, 35, L04605. doi: 10.1029/2007GL032583
 Taviani, M., Hannah, M., Harwood, D. M., Ishman, S. E., Johnson, K., Olney, M., Riesselman, C., … and the ANDRILL-SMS Science Team. (2008-2009). Palaeontological characterisation and analysis of the AND-2A core, ANDRILL Southern McMurdo Sound Project, Antarctica. Terra Antartica, 15(1-2), 113-146.
 Bertrand, E. M., Saito, M. A., Rose, J. M., Riesselman, C. R., Lohan, M. C., Noble, A. E., … DiTullio, G. R. (2007). Vitamin B12 and iron colimitation of phytoplankton growth in the Ross Sea. Limnology & Oceanography, 52(3), 1079-1093. doi: 10.4319/lo.2007.52.3.1079

Journal - Research Other 

 Dowsett, H. J., Robinson, M. M., Stoll, D. K., Foley, K. M., Johnson, A. L. A., Williams, M., & Riesselman, C. (2013). The PRISM (Pliocene palaeoclimate) reconstruction: Time for a paradigm shift. Philosophical Transactions of the Royal Society A, 371(2001), 20120524. doi: 10.1098/rsta.2012.0524

Conference Contribution - Published proceedings: Full paper 

 Riesselman, C. R., Dunbar, R. B., Mucciarone, D. A., & Kitasei, S. S. (2007). High resolution stable isotope and carbonate variability during the early Oligocene climate transition: Walvis Ridge (ODP Site 1263). In A. K. Cooper, P. Barrett, H. Staff, B. Storey, E. Stump, W. Wise & the 10th ISAES Editorial Team (Eds.), Antarctica: A Keystone in a Changing World: Proceedings of the 10th International Symposium on Antarctic Earth Sciences. Washington, DC: National Academies Press. doi: 10.3133/of2007-1047.srp095

References

External links
 Christina Riesselman's webpage

American women scientists
American oceanographers
Year of birth missing (living people)
Living people
Academic staff of the University of Otago
American Antarctic scientists
Women Antarctic scientists
Place of birth missing (living people)
Women oceanographers
American women academics
21st-century American women